Mycetophila edwardsi  is a Palearctic species of  'fungus gnat' in the family Mycetophilidae. Mycetophila edwardsi is found in forest or wooded areas where the larvae develop in fruiting bodies of large fungi.

References

External links
Images representing  Mycetophila  at BOLD

Mycetophilidae